The Albert V. Bryan United States Courthouse is a United States courthouse of the United States District Court for the Eastern District of Virginia. It is located at 401 Courthouse Square (2200 Jamieson Avenue) in Alexandria, Va., and was built in the early 1990s. It was named in honor of U.S. District Court judge Albert V. Bryan on June 26, 1995, through Congressional legislation sponsored by U.S. Senator John Warner of Virginia. From the mid-1980s until 1995, the name was applied to the 1932 federal courthouse at 200 South Washington Street that is now called the Martin V.B. Bostetter Courthouse.

References

Courthouses in Virginia
Federal courthouses in the United States
Buildings and structures in Alexandria, Virginia
Government buildings completed in 1932